Eustorg de Beaulieu or Hector de Beaulieu (around 1495 – 8 January 1552) is a French poet, composer and pastor. He was one of the first French authors to convert to protestantism.

References

External links
 

French classical composers
French male classical composers
Renaissance composers
16th-century French writers
16th-century male writers
1552 deaths
Year of birth uncertain
French male writers